Peter Burns may refer to:

Peter Burns (architect) (born 1924), Australian architect and artist
Peter Burns (baseball) (active 1890–1900), Negro leagues catcher
Peter Burns (footballer, born 1866) (1866–1952), Australian rules footballer for Geelong
Peter Burns (footballer, born 1939) (1939–2009), Australian rules footballer for St Kilda
Pete Burns (1959–2016), English singer-songwriter and television personality

See also
 Peter Byrne (disambiguation)